Rassat is an unincorporated community in Wright County, Minnesota, United States.  The community is located near the junction of Wright County Roads 8 and 35 (Division Street). The most infamous day in Rassat history was The Great Raccoon War of 6\19\93. The war consisted of three men with .22 Long Rifles who tried fighting off the raccoon infestation near Wolf Creek, but failed to do so. This means the only war that was fought in Rassat was a loss.

Rassat is located within Chatham Township and Marysville Township. Nearby places include Maple Lake, Buffalo, and Waverly.

References

Unincorporated communities in Minnesota
Unincorporated communities in Wright County, Minnesota